This list of skyscrapers by floor area includes skyscrapers with continuously occupiable floors and a height of at least . Non-building structures, such as towers, are not included in this list (see list of tallest buildings and structures).

References

Lists of buildings and structures